Sopa de mondongo is a soup made from diced tripe (the stomach of a cow or pig) slow-cooked with vegetables such as bell peppers, onions, carrots, cabbage, celery, tomatoes, cilantro, garlic or root vegetables. The dish is generally prepared in former Spanish colonies in Latin America, Caribbean, and in the Philippines.

Variations
Many variations of sopa de mondongo exist in Latin America, the Philippines and the Caribbean. Some add rice or maize late in the process. Bone marrow or hoof jelly may be used. The tripe may be soaked in citrus juice or a paste of sodium bicarbonate before cooking. The vegetables and spices used vary with availability.

In Argentina, it is also referred to as mondongo.

In Brazil, it is also referred to as mondongo or mocotó. It is usually consumed in the southern regions, but in the northeast, it is also named dobradinha. Dobradinha is made from tripe but is not the same as "sopa de mondongo".

In Colombia, sopa de mondongo is often eaten as the soup course of a traditional almuerzo.  The soup in Colombia, is often made with chicken or beef stock, with a lot of cilantro (coriander). Many vegetables such as peas, carrots, and onion are used to flavor the chicken or beef stock.  Salt and pepper, along with corn, are also thrown into the soup for extra flavoring.  The tripe used for this soup is varied.  The most typical kind of tripe is beef tripe, but in several other regions across the nation, pork tripe and chicken or turkey tripes are also used in the soup.

In the Dominican Republic sopa de mondongo is popular and easy to come by in restaurants as one of its most popular dishes on the island. Beef tripe is typically washed in lime or lemon. Onions, garlic, bell peppers, tomatoes, carrots and celery are cooked in vegetable oil before boiling. Tripe is then added with potatoes and seasoned with salt, pepper, and coleus amboinicus (locally known as Dominican orégano). Another version is mondongo guisado. This is a thicker version using tomato paste in replace of fresh tomatoes and also adding plantains, squash, olives, capers, green bananas, and replacing potatoes for cassava. Both soups are served with chopped cilantro, avocado, rice and hot sauce made with garlic, Dominican orégano, and chilies fermented in bitter orange juice called agrio de naranja.

In Panama, it is known simply as "mondongo" and it is cooked as a stew with onions, carrots, chickpeas and a bay leaf and seasoned with chorizo and/or pigtails (which are always sold salted). It is considered a heavy meal, traditionally eaten with white rice. Other side dishes include salads and sweet plantains. In the countryside when a roof is built on a new house, the future owners together with their friends and family and construction workers organize a meal known as "mondongada" where mondongo is the main course. A variant known as "mondongo a la culona" from the province of Colon also includes pig knuckles and feet and replaces chickpeas with white beans.

In Puerto Rico beef tripe is used. The tripe is washed and marinated in citrus,
salt and garlic over night. On the day of cooking, the tripe is added to a stock pot of sofrito, ham, calf feet and tail, tomato sauce, herbs, stock, squash, cassava, yam, batata, corn on the cob, chickpeas, celeriac, yautía, and potatoes. Eaten with rice, fried plantains or breadfruit, avocado, bread, and "pique criollo" a hot sauce made from steeping chilies, garlic, scallions, fruit skin and pulp, herbs, and spices in vinegar and citrus. Añasco, Puerto Rico is known for mondongo made with ham, bacon, capers, saffron, and olives garnish with almonds and with slices of pan de ague soaked in broth, milk and eggs, toasted in cornmeal and coriander seeds before frying in butter.

In El Salvador, it is also referred as "sopa de pata" is considered a very nutritious and tasty food. It is cooked with ripe banana, cabbage leaves, cassava, sesame seeds, pumpkin seeds, carrots, potatoes, huisquil, green chile, udder or beef tripe, onion and cow's feet.

In Venezuela, the dish itself is referred to as mondongo while the tripe is called "panza" (belly) and is considered a very heavy meal, often reserved as a single meal of the day. It is usually consumed in the north-central regions and in the Llanos, and depending on the region, it may turn sweeter (as in the eastern coast) or having chickpeas, but a common characteristic that all usually have, is the adding of pig feet to increase and improve the taste, and is actually the ingredient that gives the mondongo its flavor and extra high caloric content. The mondongo is often flavored with lemon or tamarind, and accompanied by arepas or casabe. Throughout Venezuela, the mondongo is eaten by the people at very early hours of the day, or late in the night, when they go out of the rumbas or parties in nightclubs. The mondongo, is also used to be sold in areperas, or restaurants specializing in arepas.

See also 
 Sancocho
 Flaki
 İşkembe çorbası
 Menudo
 Tripes à la mode de Caen

References

Venezuelan soups
Argentine cuisine
Brazilian soups
Colombian soups
Dominican Republic cuisine
Nicaraguan cuisine
Panamanian cuisine
Puerto Rican soups
Offal